Catherine Tresa Alexander (born 10 September 1989) is an Indian actress and model. She has established her career predominantly in Telugu and Tamil films. She made her debut in 2010 in the Kannada film Shankar IPS. Catherine has been nominated four times for the Filmfare Awards South.

Early life
She has acted in successful films such as Godfather (2012), Madras (2014), Sarrainodu (2016), Nene Raju Nene Mantri (2017), Kalakalappu 2 (2018).

Catherine Tresa was born to Malayali parents, Frank Mario Alexander and Tresa Alexander in Dubai. She was born as a Christian. She did her Class 12 in Dubai and moved to Bangalore for higher education. While studying, she learnt to play piano, and got trained in singing, dancing, ice skating and debating, stating that she believes that she is "good at anything I put my mind to". In Dubai, Catherine was an Emirates Environment volunteer. At the age of 14, Catherine did some amateur modelling for fashion design graduate students. After coming to India, she modeled for Nalli Silks, Chennai Silks, Fast Track, Josco Jewellers and Deccan Chronicle. She has also shot for Srikantadatta Wodeyar's Maharaja Calendar and had participated with Prasad Bidapa in numerous ramp shows across India.

Career
Catherine made her acting debut in 2010 Kannada film Shankar IPS opposite Duniya Vijay. Catherine went on to act in the Malayalam films, The Thriller and Uppukandam Brothers: Back in Action. In 2011, she did a role in the Kannada film Vishnu that she said was "equally opposite to her real life".

It was followed by the Kannada film Godfather opposite Upendra, which was directed by cinematographer turned film-maker Sethu Sriram. Catherine's character in the film was that of an older mentally challenged woman. Her performance earned her her first nomination for an award in the Best Supporting Actress category at the 60th Filmfare Awards South.

She next signed up for Chammak Challo directed by Neelakanta, in which she played "an urbane, bold and dynamic girl". It released in February 2013 and failed at the box office, but she got noticed and received positive reviews. APHerald.com called her "a treat to watch" and 123telugu.com noted that "she has the potential to be a superstar in future if she plays her cards right".

Catherine played one of the female leads in Puri Jagannadh's Telugu film Iddarammayilatho. The film released in June 2013 and won her rave reviews. Times of India reported "Catherine Tresa perfectly suits the character of Akanksha". Shirirag.com called her "cigarette smoking hot" while Idlebrain Jeevi in his review noted "with a bit of fine-tuning she can become big in Telugu films".

Catherine next appeared in Paisa by Krishna Vamsi playing a Muslim in the film, "who is sweet, very inhibited and talks a lot with her eyes" and called it "a total contrast to what I play[ed] in Chammak Challo". In 2014, she made her foray into the Tamil film industry with Madras in which she starred opposite Karthi. The second Tamil film is the S Thanu production, Kanithan directed by débutante Santosh in which she will be starring opposite Atharvaa. She then appeared in two Telugu films: Gunasekhar's Rudhramadevi, the first Indian 3D historic film, and Erra Bus, directed and produced by Dasari Narayana Rao.

Filmography

Awards and nominations

References

External links 

 
 

Living people
1989 births
People from Dubai
Indian expatriates in the United Arab Emirates
Actresses from Bangalore
Female models from Bangalore
Indian film actresses
Malayali people
Indian Christians
Actresses in Kannada cinema
Actresses in Malayalam cinema
Actresses in Telugu cinema
Actresses in Tamil cinema
Filmfare Awards South winners
South Indian International Movie Awards winners
21st-century Indian actresses